Kenneth Darryl Tuchman (born October 23, 1959) is an American entrepreneur, philanthropist, and customer experience evangelist. He is the founder, CEO and Chairman of global outsourcing company TTEC, formerly known as TeleTech.

Biography
Tuchman worked various jobs as a teenager: in a surf shop and renting lots for car sales which blossomed into a business where he would answer inquiries and then set up appointments. In the 1980s, Tuchman worked for his father's luxury-home construction business in California, which is when he first started considering the idea of a business that would serve as a centralized base for potential customer inquiries. In 1982, he founded TeleTech (now TTEC) in an old nursery school near Los Angeles allowing businesses to outsource their customer service requirements.  His first big customer was Herbalife. In 1984, after the conglomerate AT&T was broken up, TTEC was hired to monitor AT&T's transactions with customers who were switching carriers which led to business with two of the resulting phone companies, MCI, Inc. and United Telecom (subsequently Sprint Corporation), to sign up new customers.

In 1986, he moved the company to Sherman Oaks, California. In 1992, it had $6 million in revenue which grew to $50 million in 1995 and he relocated the company to Denver, Colorado.[3] In 1995, Sam Zell purchased a 17% stake in the company and in 1996, TeleTech completed its IPO. In 1999, Tuchman left the company after a disagreement with the Board over strategy but returned in 2001. The company went through a severe restructuring with numerous layoffs and consolidation of call centers.

In 2013, TTEC had operations in 14 countries. Nine of these countries provide services for onshore clients (the U.S., Australia, Brazil, Germany, Ghana, Ireland, New Zealand, South Africa and the United Kingdom); the other six countries provide services for offshore clients (Argentina, Canada, Costa Rica, India, Mexico and the Philippines). 24,000 of TeleTech's 48,000 employees are in the Philippines.  On January 9, 2018, TeleTech officially changed its name to TTEC.

Philanthropy
The Tuchmans via their foundation, the Tuchman Family Foundation, are prominent donors to National Jewish Health where his wife Debra serves on the Board of Directors.

Tuchman oversees the TeleTech Community Foundation, a not-for-profit organization dedicated to building stronger communities through education. The Tuchman Family Foundation is dedicated to accelerating progress at the intersection of technology and humanity in education, the environment and the life sciences.

External links
 Tuchman Family Foundation

References

1959 births
American billionaires
Businesspeople from Denver
Jewish American philanthropists
Living people
21st-century American Jews